Asbjørn Aarseth (21 October 1935 – 31 August 2009) was a Norwegian literary historian, born in Inderøy.

He obtained the mag.art. degree (PhD equivalent) at the University of Bergen in 1963, received an academic position in literary studies here in 1967, and became professor of Nordic literature in 1985. He was a member of the Norwegian Academy of Science and Letters.

An important book was Lyriske strukturer ("Lyrical Structures"), written together with Atle Kittang, which came to be a standard work in lyrical analysis. He was also an authority on Henrik Ibsen, and was involved in the project Henrik Ibsens skrifter.

He died in August 2009.

References

1935 births
2009 deaths
University of Bergen alumni
Academic staff of the University of Bergen
Norwegian literary historians
Members of the Norwegian Academy of Science and Letters
Henrik Ibsen researchers
People from Inderøy